The 1932 East Carolina Teachers football team was an American football team that represented East Carolina Teachers College—now known as East Carolina University—as an independent during the 1932 college football season. In their first season under head coach Kenneth Beatty, the team compiled a 0–5 record.

Schedule

References

East Carolina
College football winless seasons
East Carolina Pirates football seasons
East Carolina Teachers football